The domain name .inc is a top-level domain (TLD) in the Domain Name System of the Internet. It is operated by Intercap Registry Inc., a Cayman Islands company.

See also
 .dealer

References

External links
 

inc